Daniel "Dani" Salas Del Sar (born 23 February 1988) is a Spanish former professional footballer who played as a right back, and a scout at English club Leeds United.

Playing career
Born in Seville, Salas spent the vast majority of his senior career in his native Andalusia. He appeared in two Segunda División seasons with Sevilla FC's reserves, his first league match occurring on 6 January 2008 in a 2–1 away win against Hércules CF where he started.

On the last day of 2008–09, Salas was sent off late into a 3–3 away draw to Alicante CF. Both teams were relegated at the end of the campaign.

Subsequently, Salas represented in quick succession CD Alcalá, SD Eibar, CD San Roque de Lepe, Polideportivo Ejido and CD Mairena.

Scouting career
Salas joined English Championship club Leeds United in 2017, as part of compatriot Víctor Orta's scouting network.

References

External links

Futbolme profile 

1988 births
Living people
Footballers from Seville
Spanish footballers
Association football defenders
Segunda División players
Segunda División B players
Tercera División players
Sevilla FC C players
Sevilla Atlético players
CD Alcalá players
SD Eibar footballers
CD San Roque de Lepe footballers
Polideportivo Ejido footballers
Leeds United F.C. non-playing staff
Spanish expatriate sportspeople in England